Ralph A. Jackson III (born October 26, 1962) is an American former professional basketball player who played briefly in the National Basketball Association (NBA).

Jackson attended Inglewood High School in Inglewood, California. The school's basketball team was the nation's top-ranked team in 1980, going undefeated and winning the national championship, with Jackson the CIF player of the year and all-time assists leader. At UCLA, Jackson averaged 8.4 points, 4.7 assists, 2.6 rebounds and 1.3 steals in 111 career games between 1980 and 1984.

Jackson was selected by the Indiana Pacers in the fourth round of the 1984 NBA draft with the 71st overall pick. He signed with the Pacers on September 1, 1984, and played his one and only NBA game on November 7 against the Philadelphia 76ers. He was waived by the Pacers on November 9. On November 20, he was acquired by the Toronto Tornados of the Continental Basketball Association. He averaged 8.3 points, 4.0 assists, 2.7 rebounds and 1.6 steals in 47 games for the Tornados during the 1984–85 season. He returned to the franchise in 1985–86, with the team moving to Florida mid-season and becoming the Pensacola Tornados. In 14 games, he averaged 7.6 points, 4.1 assists and 2.1 rebounds per game.

References

External links

1962 births
Living people
Inglewood High School (California) alumni
American expatriate basketball people in Canada
American men's basketball players
Basketball players from Los Angeles
Indiana Pacers draft picks
Indiana Pacers players
McDonald's High School All-Americans
Parade High School All-Americans (boys' basketball)
Pensacola Tornados (1985–86) players
Point guards
Toronto Tornados players
UCLA Bruins men's basketball players